John McLaren Yuill (born 12 December 1948) is a former professional tennis player from South Africa. Most of his tennis success was in doubles. During his career, he won two doubles titles.

Career finals

Doubles (2 titles, 2 runner-ups)

References

External links
 
 

South African male tennis players
Living people
1948 births
Sportspeople from Durban
White South African people